Carbognano is a  (municipality) in the Province of Viterbo in the Italian region of Latium, located about  northwest of Rome and about  southeast of Viterbo.

Carbognano borders the following municipalities: Caprarola, Fabrica di Roma, Nepi, Vallerano.

Demographic evolution

References

External links
 www.comune.carbognano.vt.it/
 http://www.carbognanonline.it/

Cities and towns in Lazio